Lloyd John Ogilvie (September 2, 1930 – June 5, 2019) was a Presbyterian minister who served as Chaplain of the United States Senate from the 104th through 108th Congresses (1995–2003).

Early years
Lloyd John Oglivie, was born in Kenosha, Wisconsin on September 2, 1930. Educated in the public schools of Kenosha, he graduated from Lake Forest College (B.A.) and Garrett Theological Seminary (Th.M.). He conducted postgraduate studies at the New College of the University of Edinburgh in Scotland.

Ministry career

Student Pastor, Gurnee Community Church, Gurnee, Illinois (1952–1956)
Pastor, Winnetka Presbyterian Church, Winnetka, Illinois (1956–1962)
Pastor, First Presbyterian Church, Bethlehem, Pennsylvania (1962–1972)
Pastor, First Presbyterian Church of Hollywood, Los Angeles, California (1972–1995)
Chaplain, United States Senate, Washington, D.C. (1995–2003)
President, Leadership Unlimited (2003–2019)

Media ministry
Lloyd Ogilvie's former nationally syndicated radio and television ministry was called "Let God Love You." This weekly television ministry ran for seventeen years and the daily radio ministry spanned ten years. "Let God Love You" was recorded at and broadcast from First Presbyterian Church of Hollywood, in Los Angeles, California. This media ministry was guided by the strong national Board of Directors of the Lloyd Ogilvie Ministries, an independent, non-profit organization. In 1982, the Directors adopted "Ten Commitments" for the development of the ministry and its financial accountability. Dr. Ogilvie brought to this media ministry the same commitment to listening he expressed as pastor of his church. His messages on the "Let God Love You" programs were his part of an ongoing dialogue with his listeners and viewers. On every program he encouraged them to write him about what was on their minds and hearts. His voluminous correspondence with people and a special yearly inventory of their deepest concerns provided the focus of this personal sharing of grace. The central purpose was to help people turn life's struggles into stepping stones by linking their problems to the promises and power of God. Beginning sixteen years ago with one television station in Los Angeles, the "Let God Love You" program expanded throughout the nation on independent stations and cable networks. The media ministry was supported exclusively by viewer and listener contributions and all gifts were used only for costs of producing and airing the programs. Dr. Ogilvie received no salary from the media ministry.

Senate chaplaincy
On January 24, 1995, Dr. Ogilvie was elected the 61st Chaplain of the United States Senate. He began his responsibilities on March 11, 1995. In addition to opening the Senate each day in prayer, his duties as full-time Chaplain included counseling and spiritual care for the Senators, their families and their staffs, a combined constituency of six thousand people. Dr. Ogilvie's days were filled with meetings with Senators about spiritual and moral issues, assisting Senators' staffs with research on theological and biblical questions, speaking to five Senate Bible Study and Prayer groups, encouraging such groups at the weekly Senate Prayer Breakfast, and sharing in small discussion and reflection groups among the Senators. He defined the Chaplaincy as non-political, non-partisan and non-sectarian. In Dr. Ogilvie's words, "I saw my role as Chaplain to be an intercessor for the members of the Senate family, a trusted prayer partner, and a faithful counselor to them as they sought to know and do God's will in the monumental responsibilities entrusted to them."

Death
His death at the age of 88 was announced by Fuller Seminary with which he established the Lloyd John Ogilvie Institute of Preaching in 2006.

Awards and degrees

Partial List of Awards 
Distinguished Service Citation, Lake Forest College
Preacher of the Year, Religion in Media
Angel Award for Religion in Media
Silver Angel Award for Television Ministry (1982, 1986)
Gold Medallion Book Award for "Making Stress Work For You" (1985)
William Booth Award, The Salvation Army (1992)
One of 12 Individuals Named in Worldwide Survey, "Twelve Most Effective Preachers in the English-Speaking World," Baylor University (1996)

Honorary degrees 
Doctor of Divinity, Whitworth University (1973)
Doctor of Humane Letters, University of Redlands (1974)
Doctor of Humanities, Moravian College (1975)
Doctor of Laws, Eastern University (1988)
Doctor of Humane Letters, Seattle Pacific University (1995)
Doctor of Divinity, Westmont College (1997)
Doctor of Divinity, Lake Forest College (1997)
Doctor of Laws, George Fox University (1997)
Doctor of Humanities, Dickinson College (1998)
Doctor of Laws, Pepperdine University (1998)
Doctor of Divinity, Lehigh University (1999)
Doctor of Sacred Theology, Roberts Wesleyan College (2000)
Doctor of Laws, Belhaven University (2001)
Doctor of Divinity, Azusa Pacific University (2001)
Doctor of Divinity, University of Edinburgh (2003)
Doctor of Divinity, Carthage College (2004)
Doctor of Divinity, Asbury College (2008)
Doctor of Letters, King's College (2008)

Books

Chronological List:
A Life Full of Surprises – 1968	Abingdon Press
Let God Love You (Philippians) – 1974	Word Books
If I Should Wake Before I Die – 1974	Regal Books
Lord of the Ups and Downs – 1974	Regal Books
Life Without Limits (Mark) – 1975	Word Books
You've Got Charisma – 1975	Abingdon Press
Drumbeat of Love (Acts) – 1976	Word Books
The Cup of Wonder (Communion Messages) – 1976	Tyndale Books
You Are Loved and Forgiven (Colossians) – 1977	Regal Books
When God First Thought of You – 1978	Word Books
The Autobiography of God (On the Parables) – 1979	Regal Books
The Beauty of Caring – 1980	Harvest Books
The Beauty of Friendship – 1980	Harvest Books
The Beauty of Love – 1980	Harvest Books
The Beauty of Sharing – 1980	Harvest Books
The Bush is Still Burning (The "I Am" Sayings of Jesus) – 1980	Word Books
Congratulations-God Believes in You (Beatitudes) – 1980	Word Books
Magnificent Vision (formerly "Radiance of the Inner Splendor") – 1980	Vine Books
You Can Live As It Was Meant To Be (I & II Thes.) – 1980	Regal Books
Ask Him Anything (Answers to Life's Deepest Questions) – 1980	Word Books
God's Best for My Life (Daily Devotional) – 1981	Harvest Books
Discovering God's Will in Your Life – 1982	Harvest House
You Can Pray With Power – 1983	Regal Books
Longing To Be Free – 1984	Harvest Books
Lord of the Impossible (Prophets) – 1984	Abingdon Press
Falling Into Greatness (Psalms) – 1984	Thomas Nelson
Making Stress Work For You – 1984	Word Books
If God Cares, Why Do I Still Have Problems? – 1985	Word Books
Jesus The Healer (The Healing Ministry) – 1985	Revell Co.
Understanding the Hard Sayings of Jesus – 1988	Word Books
Living Without Fear (12 Steps) – 1987	Word Books
A Future and a Hope – 1988	Word Books
God's Transforming Love (Daily Devotional) – 1988	Regal Books
Your Will, God's Will – 1988	Harvest House
Enjoying God (Ephesians) – 1989	Word Books
Silent Strength (Daily Devotional) – 1990	Harvest House
Lord of the Loose Ends ("He is Able" claims of the Epistles) – 1991	Word Books
Conversation With God (Prayer) – 1992	Harvest House
Climbing the Rainbow (Claiming the Covenant Promise) – 1993	Word Books
Turn Your Struggles Into Stepping Stones (Daily Devotional) – 1993	Word Books
The Greatest Counselor in the World (Holy Spirit) – 1994	Servant Publ.
The Heart of God – 1994	Regal Books
Asking God Your Hardest Questions	Harold Shaw (formerly Ask Him Anything) – 1996
One Quiet Moment – 1997	Harvest House
Acts of the Holy Spirit – 1999	Shaw Publishers
Facing the Future Without Fear – 1999	Servant Publ.
Quiet Moments With God – 2000	Harvest House
Perfect Peace – 2001	Harvest House
Intimate Prayer (formerly Conversation with God) – 2002	Harvest House
When You Need A Miracle – 2004 Harvest House
Praying Through The Tough Times – 2005 Harvest House
The Red Ember In The White Ash – 2006 Harvest House

General Editor of: Thirty-three volume Communicators Commentary Series of the Bible (Word Books)

Author of Communicators Commentary volumes:
Books of Hosea, Joel, Amos, Obadiah, Jonah/Vol. 20 (Word Books)
Book of Acts/Vol. 5 (Word Books)

Personal life
He was married to Mary Jane Jenkins Ogilvie and widowed in 2003. He later remarried Doris Kaiser Sumner. Children: Heather, Scott, Andrew Ogilvie.
Grandchildren: Erin, Airley, Bonnie and Scotter Ogilvie.

References

External links

1930 births
2019 deaths
People from Kenosha, Wisconsin
Writers from Wisconsin
Chaplains of the United States Senate
Garrett–Evangelical Theological Seminary alumni
Lake Forest College alumni
United Presbyterian Church in the United States of America ministers